Henry Dawson Lowry (22 February 1869 – 21 October 1906) was an English journalist, short story writer, novelist and poet.

Early life
Lowry was born at Truro, as the eldest son of Thomas Shaw Lowry, bank clerk at Truro, afterwards bank manager at Camborne, by his wife Winifred Dawson of Redhill. Catherine Amy Dawson Scott was his cousin. Educated at Queen's College, Taunton, and then at the University of Oxford (unattached to a particular Oxford college) with B.A. in chemistry in 1891.

Writing and career 
In 1891, Lowry's Cornish stories were accepted by W. E. Henley for publication in the National Observer and a number of his subsequent novels focussed on life in Cornwall. Two years later, in 1893 Lowry took up residence in London and wrote for the Pall Mall Gazette, becoming a staff member in 1895. Subsequent to this, Lowry was on the staff of Black and White from 1895 to 1897.

Early in 1897, Lowry became the editor of the Ludgate Magazine and later in the year joined the staff of the Morning Post.  In his career at the Pall Mall Gazette, the Black and White, Ludgate Magazine, and the Morning Post, Lowry worked closely with James Nicol Dunn and Lowry dedicated his 1895 book Women

's Tragedies to Dunn.  Lowry wrote under the pseudonym "The Impenitent" for the Daily Express and occasionally contributed to other newspapers and magazines.

In 1896, Lowry was the subject of a pencil drawing by Australian artist Percy Spence, now held at the National Portrait Gallery.

Later life and legacy 
Lowry was consistently sickly throughout his life and died at his home at Herne Hill, south London, of pneumonia on 22 October 1906 aged 37 and is buried in a graveyard in Norwood, London.  In 1912, Edgar Preston wrote a memoir of Lowry in A Dream of Daffodils; Last Poems by H.D. Lowry, where he described Lowry thus: 'his whole story was composed of a few small volumes of verse, some earnest friendships, one passion, and a premature death'.

Lowry's cousin Catherine Amy Dawson Scott, who did some editing of his poetry, used text by Lowry adapting one of her own novels (The Haunting, 1921) into the libretto for the opera Gale by Ethel Leginska, which premiered in Chicago at the Civic Opera House, with John Charles Thomas in the lead, on 23 November 1935.

Selected works

References

1869 births
1906 deaths
Alumni of the University of Oxford
People educated at Queen's College, Taunton
People from Truro
English male journalists
19th-century English male writers
English male short story writers
English short story writers
English male novelists
English male poets
19th-century British journalists
19th-century English novelists
19th-century British short story writers
19th-century English poets